Overseas Chinese Daily News (OCDN) is a Chinese language newspaper in Malaysia.

History 
Its first newsprint hit the streets of Kota Kinabalu (was known as Jesselton then) on 1 March 1936. It was the first daily in Sabah (was known as North Borneo then). 

The late Tan Sri Yeh Pao Tzu took over the paper in 1949, and served as its publisher cum chief editor. He was a graduate in Journalism from Fu Tan University, China. Yeh died in 1987 and his wife succeeded him as the Chairman. His son, Clement Yeh Chang became the publisher.

References

External links 
 Official website 

1936 establishments in North Borneo
Chinese-language mass media in Malaysia
Newspapers published in Malaysia
Publications established in 1936
Mass media in Kota Kinabalu
Chinese-language newspapers